USS Fall River may refer to:

 is a 

United States Navy ship names